KP Łódź is a professional beach soccer team based in Łódź, Poland.

Honours

Polish competitions 
Ekstraklasa
 Winners: 2014, 2017, 2019
 Runners-up: 2016

Polish Beach Soccer Cup
 Winners: 2014, 2015, 2016, 2017, 2018

Polish Beach Soccer Supercup
 Winners: 2014, 2017
 Runners-up: 2015

International competitions 
Euro Winners Cup
 Runners-up: 2019
 Third place: 2018
 1/8: 2015

2018 Euro Winners Cup squad 

Coach:  Marcin Stanisławski

External links 
  Owner official site
  KP Łódź on beachsoccer.com
  KP Łódź on beachsoccerrussia.ru

Sport in Łódź
Polish beach soccer clubs